Mayuge Sugar Industries Limited (MSIL) is a sugar manufacturer in Uganda, the third-largest economy in the East African Community.

Location
The coordinates of the company headquarters and factory are 0°30'21.0"N, 33°24'55.0"E (Latitude:0.505824; Longitude:33.415278).

Overview
The company is a medium-sized sugar manufacturer, established in 2005, with production capacity of 60,000 metric tonnes annually. The sugar factory also owns and operates Mayuge Thermal Power Station, a 1.6 megawatt co-generation electric facility, with expandable capacity to 22 MW. MSIL is one of the newer sugar producers in the country that contributed to the projected national output of 450,000 metric tonnes expected in 2004.

Ownership
MSIL is a wholly owned subsidiary of Maheswaris & Patels Group of Companies (M&P Group), an industrial conglomerate, whose interests include sugar manufacturing, electricity generation, steel manufacturing, metal fabrication and construction.

Memberships
Mayuge Sugar Industries Limited is not a member of Uganda Sugar Manufacturers Association (USMA), an industry group of leading sugar manufacturers in the county. The company is a member of Uganda Manufacturers Association (UMA), an industry group.

See also
 Economy of Uganda
 List of sugar manufacturers in Uganda

References

External links
 Official website

Companies established in 2005
Mayuge District
Eastern Region, Uganda
Sugar companies of Uganda
Agriculture in Uganda
Agriculture companies established in 2005
2005 establishments in Uganda